Glycated hemoglobin, also known as HbA1c, glycohemoglobin, hemoglobin A1c, A1C, is a form of hemoglobin (Hb) that is chemically linked to a sugar. Most monosaccharides, including glucose, galactose and fructose, spontaneously (i.e. non-enzymatically) bond with hemoglobin when present in the bloodstream. However, glucose is less likely to do so than galactose and fructose (13% that of fructose and 21% that of galactose), which may explain why glucose is used as the primary metabolic fuel in humans.

The formation of the sugar-hemoglobin linkage indicates the presence of excessive sugar in the bloodstream, often indicative of diabetes in high concentration (HbA1c >6.4%). A1C is of particular interest because it is easy to detect. The process by which sugars attach to hemoglobin is called glycation and the reference system is based on HbA1c, defined as beta-N-1-deoxy fructosyl haemoglobin as component.

HbA1c is measured primarily to determine the three-month average blood sugar level and can be used as a diagnostic test for diabetes mellitus and as an assessment test for glycemic control in people with diabetes. The test is limited to a three-month average because the average lifespan of a red blood cell is four months. Since individual red blood cells have varying lifespans, the test is used as a limited measure of three months. Normal levels of glucose produce a normal amount of glycated hemoglobin. As the average amount of plasma glucose increases, the fraction of glycated hemoglobin increases in a predictable way. In diabetes, higher amounts of glycated hemoglobin, indicating poorer control of blood glucose levels, have been associated with cardiovascular disease, nephropathy, neuropathy, and retinopathy.

Terminology
Glycated hemoglobin is preferred over glycosylated hemoglobin to reflect the correct (non-enzymatic) process. Early literature often used glycosylated as it was unclear which process was involved until further research was performed. The terms are still sometimes used interchangeably in English-language literature.

The naming of HbA1c derives from hemoglobin type A being separated on cation exchange chromatography. The first fraction to separate, probably considered to be pure hemoglobin A, was designated HbA0, and the following fractions were designated HbA1a, HbA1b, and HbA1c, in their order of elution. Improved separation techniques have subsequently led to the isolation of more subfractions.

History
Hemoglobin A1c was first separated from other forms of hemoglobin by Huisman and Meyering in 1958 using a chromatographic column. It was first characterized as a glycoprotein by Bookchin and Gallop in 1968. Its increase in diabetes was first described in 1969 by Samuel Rahbar et al. The reactions leading to its formation were characterized by Bunn and his coworkers in 1975.

The use of hemoglobin A1c for monitoring the degree of control of glucose metabolism in diabetic patients was proposed in 1976 by Anthony Cerami, Ronald Koenig and coworkers.

Damage mechanisms 
Glycated hemoglobin causes an increase of highly reactive free radicals inside blood cells, altering the properties of their cell membranes. This leads to blood cell aggregation and increased blood viscosity, which results in impaired blood flow.

Another way glycated hemoglobin causes damage is via inflammation, which results in atherosclerotic plaque (atheroma) formation. Free-radical build-up promotes the excitation of Fe2+-hemoglobin through  into abnormal ferryl hemoglobin (Fe4+-Hb). Fe4+ is unstable and reacts with specific amino acids in hemoglobin to regain its Fe3+ oxidation state. Hemoglobin molecules clump together via cross-linking reactions, and these hemoglobin clumps (multimers) promote cell damage and the release of Fe4+-hemoglobin into the matrix of innermost layers (subendothelium) of arteries and veins. This results in increased permeability of interior surface (endothelium) of blood vessels and production of pro-inflammatory monocyte adhesion proteins, which promote macrophage accumulation in blood vessel surfaces, ultimately leading to harmful plaques in these vessels.

Highly glycated Hb-AGEs go through vascular smooth muscle layer and inactivate acetylcholine-induced endothelium-dependent relaxation, possibly through binding to nitric oxide (NO), preventing its normal function. NO is a potent vasodilator and also inhibits formation of plaque-promoting LDLs (i.e. “bad cholesterol”) oxidized form.

This overall degradation of blood cells also releases heme from them. Loose heme can cause oxidation of endothelial and LDL proteins, which results in plaques.

Principle in medical diagnostics
Glycation of proteins is a frequent occurrence, but in the case of hemoglobin, a nonenzymatic condensation reaction occurs between glucose and the N-end of the beta chain. This reaction produces a Schiff base (R-N=CHR', R = beta chain, CHR'= glucose-derived), which is itself converted to 1-deoxyfructose. This second conversion is an example of an Amadori rearrangement.
When blood glucose levels are high, glucose molecules attach to the hemoglobin in red blood cells. The longer hyperglycemia occurs in blood, the more glucose binds to hemoglobin in the red blood cells and the higher the glycated hemoglobin.

Once a hemoglobin molecule is glycated, it remains that way. A buildup of glycated hemoglobin within the red cell, therefore, reflects the average level of glucose to which the cell has been exposed during its life-cycle. Measuring glycated hemoglobin assesses the effectiveness of therapy by monitoring long-term serum glucose regulation.

A1c is a weighted average of blood glucose levels during the life of the red blood cells (117 days for men and 106 days in women). Therefore, glucose levels on days nearer to the test contribute substantially more to the level of A1c than the levels in days further from the test.

This is also supported by data from clinical practice showing that HbA1c levels improved significantly after 20 days from start or intensification of glucose-lowering treatment.

Measurement
Several techniques are used to measure hemoglobin A1c. Laboratories may use high-performance liquid chromatography, immunoassay, enzymatic assay, capillary electrophoresis, or boronate affinity chromatography. Point of care (e.g., doctor's office) devices use immunoassay boronate affinity chromatography.

In the United States, HbA1c testing laboratories are certified by the National Glycohemoglobin Standardization Program  to standardize them against the results of the 1993 Diabetes Control and Complications Trial (DCCT). An additional percentage scale, Mono S has previously been in use by Sweden and KO500 is in use in Japan.

Switch to IFCC units
The American Diabetes Association, European Association for the Study of Diabetes, and International Diabetes Federation have agreed that, in the future, HbA1c is to be reported in the International Federation of Clinical Chemistry and Laboratory Medicine (IFCC) units. IFCC reporting was introduced in Europe except for the UK in 2003; the UK carried out dual reporting from 1 June 2009  until 1 October 2011.

Conversion between DCCT and IFCC is by the following equation:

Interpretation of results
Laboratory results may differ depending on the analytical technique, the age of the subject, and biological variation among individuals. Higher levels of HbA1c are found in people with persistently elevated blood sugar, as in diabetes mellitus. While diabetic patient treatment goals vary, many include a target range of HbA1c values. A diabetic person with good glucose control has an HbA1c level that is close to or within the reference range.

The International Diabetes Federation and the American College of Endocrinology recommend HbA1c values below 48 mmol/mol (6.5 DCCT %), while the American Diabetes Association recommends HbA1c be below 53 mmol/mol (7.0 DCCT %) for most patients. Results from large trials in  suggested that a target below 53 mmol/mol (7 DCCT %) for older adults with type 2 diabetes may be excessive: Below 53 mmol/mol, the health benefits of reduced A1c become smaller, and the intensive glycemic control required to reach this level leads to an increased rate of dangerous hypoglycemic episodes.

A retrospective study of 47,970 type 2 diabetes patients, aged 50 years and older, found that patients with an HbA1c more than 48 mmol/mol (6.5 DCCT %) had an increased mortality rate, but a later international study contradicted these findings.

A review of the UKPDS,  Action to Control Cardiovascular Risk in Diabetes (ACCORD), Advance and Veterans Affairs Diabetes Trials (VADT) estimated that the risks of the main complications of diabetes (diabetic retinopathy, diabetic nephropathy, diabetic neuropathy, and macrovascular disease) decreased by about 3% for every 1 mmol/mol decrease in HbA1c.

However, a trial by ACCORD designed specifically to determine whether reducing HbA1c below 6.0% using increased amounts of medication would reduce the rate of cardiovascular events found higher mortality with this intensive therapy, so much so that the trial was terminated 17 months early.

Practitioners must consider  patients' health, their risk of hypoglycemia, and their specific health risks when setting a target HbA1c level. Because patients are responsible for averting or responding to their own hypoglycemic episodes, their input and the doctors' assessments of the patients' self-care skills are also important.

Persistent elevations in blood sugar (and, therefore, HbA1c) increase the risk of long-term vascular complications of diabetes, such as coronary disease, heart attack, stroke, heart failure, kidney failure, blindness, erectile dysfunction, neuropathy (loss of sensation, especially in the feet), gangrene, and gastroparesis (slowed emptying of the stomach). Poor blood glucose control also increases the risk of short-term complications of surgery such as poor wound healing.

Lower-than-expected levels of HbA1c can be seen in people with shortened red blood cell lifespans, such as with glucose-6-phosphate dehydrogenase deficiency, sickle-cell disease, or any other condition causing premature red blood cell death. Blood donation will result in rapid replacement of lost RBCs with newly formed red blood cells. Since these new RBCs will have only existed for a short period of time, their presence will lead HbA1c to underestimate the actual average levels. There may also be distortions resulting from blood donation during the preceding two months, due to an abnormal synchronization of the age of the RBCs, resulting in an older than normal average blood cell life (resulting in an overestimate of actual average blood glucose levels). Conversely, higher-than-expected levels can be seen in people with a longer red blood cell lifespan, such as with iron deficiency.

Results can be unreliable in many circumstances, for example after blood loss, after surgery, blood transfusions, anemia, or high erythrocyte turnover; in the presence of chronic renal or liver disease; after administration of high-dose vitamin C; or erythropoetin treatment. In general, the reference range (that found in healthy young persons), is about 30–33 mmol/mol (4.9–5.2 DCCT %). The mean  HbA1c for diabetics type 1 in Sweden in 2014 was 63 mmol/mol (7.9 DCCT%) and for type 2, 61 mmol/mol (7.7 DCCT%).

The approximate mapping between HbA1c values given in DCCT percentage (%) and eAG (estimated average glucose) measurements is given by the following equation:
eAG(mg/dL) = 28.7 × A1C − 46.7eAG(mmol/L) = 1.59 × A1C − 2.59Data in parentheses are 95% confidence intervals

Normal, prediabetic, and diabetic range
The 2010 American Diabetes Association Standards of Medical Care in Diabetes added the =HbA1c ≥ 48 mmol/mol (≥6.5 DCCT %) as another criterion for the diagnosis of diabetes.

Indications and uses
Glycated hemoglobin testing is recommended for both checking the blood sugar control in people who might be prediabetic and monitoring blood sugar control in patients with more elevated levels, termed diabetes mellitus. For a single blood sample, it provides far more revealing information on glycemic behavior than a fasting blood sugar value. However, fasting blood sugar tests are crucial in making treatment decisions. The American Diabetes Association guidelines are similar to others in advising that the glycated hemoglobin test be performed at least twice a year in patients with diabetes who are meeting treatment goals (and who have stable glycemic control) and quarterly in patients with diabetes whose therapy has changed or who are not meeting glycemic goals.

Glycated hemoglobin measurement is not appropriate where a change in diet or treatment has been made within six weeks. Likewise, the test assumes a normal red blood cell aging process and mix of hemoglobin subtypes (predominantly HbA in normal adults). Hence, people with recent blood loss, hemolytic anemia, or genetic differences in the hemoglobin molecule (hemoglobinopathy) such as sickle-cell disease and other conditions, as well as those who have donated blood recently, are not suitable for this test.

Due to glycated hemoglobin's variability (as shown in the table above), additional measures should be checked in patients at or near recommended goals. People with HbA1c values at 64 mmol/mol or less should be provided additional testing to determine whether the HbA1c values are due to averaging out high blood glucose (hyperglycemia) with low blood glucose (hypoglycemia) or the HbA1c is more reflective of an elevated blood glucose that does not vary much throughout the day. Devices such as continuous blood glucose monitoring allow people with diabetes to determine their blood glucose levels on a continuous basis, testing every few minutes. Continuous use of blood glucose monitors is becoming more common, and the devices are covered by many health insurance plans, but not by Medicare in the United States. The supplies tend to be expensive, since the sensors must be changed at least every 2 weeks. Another useful test in determining if HbA1c values are due to wide variations of blood glucose throughout the day is 1,5-anhydroglucitol, also known as GlycoMark. GlycoMark reflects only the times that the person experiences hyperglycemia above 180 mg/dL over a two-week period.

Concentrations of hemoglobin A1 (HbA1) are increased, both in diabetic patients and in patients with kidney failure, when measured by ion-exchange chromatography. The thiobarbituric acid method (a chemical method specific for the detection of glycation) shows that patients with kidney failure have values for glycated hemoglobin similar to those observed in normal subjects, suggesting that the high values in these patients are a result of binding of something other than glucose to hemoglobin.

In autoimmune hemolytic anemia, concentrations of HbA1 is undetectable. Administration of prednisolone will allow the HbA1 to be detected. The alternative fructosamine test may be used in these circumstances and it also reflects an average of blood glucose levels over the preceding 2 to 3 weeks.

All the major institutions such as the International Expert Committee Report, drawn from the International Diabetes Federation, the European Association for the Study of Diabetes, and the American Diabetes Association, suggest the HbA1c level of 48 mmol/mol (6.5 DCCT %) as a diagnostic level. The Committee Report further states that, when HbA1c testing cannot be done, the fasting and glucose-tolerance tests be done. Diagnosis of diabetes during pregnancy continues to require fasting and glucose-tolerance measurements for gestational diabetes, and not the glycated hemoglobin.

Modification by diet
Meta-analysis has shown probiotics to cause a statistically significant reduction in glycated hemoglobin in type 2 diabetics. Trials with multiple strains of probiotics had statistically significant reductions in glycated hemoglobin, whereas trials with single strains did not.

Standardization and traceability
Hemoglobin A1c is now standardized and traceable to IFCC methods HPLC-CE and HPLC-MS. The change to the newer unit of mmol/mol is part of this standardization. The standardized test does not test for iodine levels in the blood; hypothyroidism or iodine supplementation are known to artificially raise the A1c.

Veterinary medicine
HbA1c testing has not been found useful in the treatment of cats and dogs with diabetes, and is not generally used; fructosamine is favoured instead.

See also
 Diabetes mellitus
 Hemoglobin A2
 Prediabetes
 Proteopedia: Structure of glycated hemoglobin

References

External links

 National Diabetes Information Clearinghouse 
 American Diabetes Association Standards of Medical Care 2007

Blood tests
Diabetes-related tests
Diabetes
Glucose
Hemoglobins